The 2007 CONCACAF U17 Tournament was played in Honduras and Jamaica.

Qualification

United States, Canada received automatic qualification to the finals. Honduras and Jamaica qualified as hosts. Nonetheless, Jamaica participated the CFU Youth Cup, which served as the qualification of the 2007 CONCACAF U17 Tournament for the Caribbean Zone.

Squads

Group A

All games were played in Tegucigalpa, Honduras.

Group B

All games were played in Kingston, Jamaica.

Qualified

 
2007
U-17
2007
2007
2006–07 in Costa Rican football
2006–07 in Mexican football
2006–07 in Honduran football
2007 in Cuban sport
2006–07 in Salvadoran football
2007 in Canadian soccer
2007 in American soccer
2007 in Haitian sport
2006–07 in Jamaican football
2007 in Trinidad and Tobago football